Mahmoud Kamal Muftić (born ca. 1925/1926 in Sarajevo, died September 1971 in London; also spelled Mahmut Kemal Muftić, was a Bosnian Muslim medical doctor, scientist, Islamic religious scholar and Muslim Brotherhood activist. Muftić was a complex man of wide interests that encompassed politics, religion and science. His scientific work focused on topics as diverse as bacteriology, botany, hypnosis and parapsychology. The focus of his political activity was in the intersection of pan-Islamism and anti-communism during the Cold War. Muftić spent years in the Middle East before returning to Europe in 1962, and was an important confidant of his wife's cousin Said Ramadan, one of the Muslim Brotherhood's main leaders.

Career

Muftić, a keenly religious Bosnian Muslim, grew up in Sarajevo in what is now Bosnia and Herzegovina. While still a teenager Muftić became involved in the Croatian counter-insurgency campaign against communist-led Yugoslav partisans. By 1945 he and other Bosnian Muslims found themselves in refugee camps in Italy, unable to return to now-communist Yugoslavia, but courted by several Muslim nations of the Middle East who saw them as fellow Muslims in need and also sought their military experience. In 1947 he was among the 135 Bosnian and Albanian Muslims who were granted asylum by Egypt at the behest of Prince Amr Ibrahim, a member of the Egyptian royal family. In Egypt he became acquainted with Said Ramadan, one of the preeminent leaders of the Muslim Brotherhood and the son-in-law of the brotherhood's founder Hassan al-Banna, and he later married Ramadan's cousin, a medical doctor from a prominent Egyptian family. Along with other members of the Muslim Brotherhood he volunteered for service in the Arab Liberation Army in the 1948 Arab–Israeli War.

Between the late 1940s and the early 1960s he worked for a number of research institutes and hospitals in Saudi Arabia, Egypt, Iraq and Palestine. As of 1949 he worked for the Biological Laboratories of Saudi Arabia in Jeddah. As of 1953 he worked for the mycological section of AMA Laboratories in Heliopolis, Cairo. Before 1955 he moved to Iraq, where he worked at the Middle Euphrat Hospital in Kufa around 1955, then at King Faisal Hospital in Nasiriyah around 1956–1957 and finally at the Royal Hospital in Basra around 1957–1958. In Iraq he was able to continue his research with support from the Iraqi Ministry of Health. Following the 1958 14 July Revolution that overthrew the Hashemite monarchy in Iraq he returned to Egypt to work for the Galenus Pharmaceutical Laboratories in Giza near Cairo. In 1960 he was based in Gaza in Palestine, at the time part of the United Arab Republic. It is unclear whether his frequent relocations were related to the conflict between the Egyptian government and the Muslim Brotherhood, that led many members of the brotherhood to seek sanctuary in Saudi Arabia, among them Said Ramadan. He was at one point accused of being a Russian spy when living in Iraq, and was later described as having ties to several intelligence services.

During the 1950s and 1960s Egypt and Syria moved in a socialist direction, and as a result West Germany decided to accept political refugees from these countries. Thousands of Arab students and scholars moved to West Germany in the 1950s and 1960s. As part of this wave of political refugees, Muftić moved from Gaza to West Germany in 1962 to work for the Tuberculosis Research Institute in Schleswig-Holstein. He then became a researcher at Schering AG in West Berlin, where he became director of the bacteriological department. He also held a secondary appointment at the Biochemical Laboratory at the University of Lausanne in Switzerland. He moved to Geneva in the late 1960s. He also had ties to the United Kingdom, especially as part of his political work, and spent much time in London. At the time of his death he was affiliated with the Biochemistry Department at Trinity College, Dublin.

Research
Muftić's main research interests were medical microbiology and hypnosis. He published around 40 papers in medical journals. He was also a co-inventor of several patents held by Schering. He also wrote articles on Yugoslav politics, the Middle East conflict and Islamic theology. He was also interested in experimental or parapsychological topics; building upon the work of Walter John Kilner and under the sponsorship of the Metaphysical Research Group of the United Kingdom, he published a book on aura phenomena, based on research he carried out in the 1950s on the human energy field with a device utilizing a semiconductor and an electroluminescent panel called an optron.

Muftić discovered and named a species of yeastlike fungus, blastomyces cerolytica. His author abbreviation in botany is "Muftic."

He was a Fellow of the American Institute of Hypnosis, an institution founded by his "long time personal and professional friend" William Joseph Bryan, whose work notably found use in psychological warfare during the Cold War. According to Bryan, Muftić was "a true scientist in every way [who] always looked for physical and chemical explanations of psychological problems. He frequently took as his motto Gerard's famous statement, 'there can be no twisted thought without a twisted molecule.'"

Religious and political activity
Muftić was a close confidant of his wife's relative Said Ramadan since the time he was living in Egypt, and through this family connection to the founding family of the Muslim Brotherhood he became involved with the brotherhood's activities. Muftić's political activity took place in the intersection of pan-Islamism and anti-communism. At the time Said Ramadan was the main U.S. intelligence asset among Muslim leaders, as the CIA sought to use the cause of pan-Islamism to fight communism. Muftić's political agenda was complex, and according to Ivo Mišur it is unclear if he involved himself with Croatian nationalism in order to promote Islamism or vice versa. Muftić was a member of the executive of the Croatian National Resistance from 1960 to 1964, and was singularly responsible for the cooperation between that organisation and the Muslim Brotherhood in the early 1960s. He was also heavily involved in the negotiations with Saudi Arabia for the formal recognition of the exiled Croatian state, in order to secure Saudi material assistance in "the fight against communism and for the liberation of Croatia," and in the dialogue between Croatian emigrant circles and the Muslim world in general. He was the Yugoslav delegate to the World Muslim Congress in 1962. The establishment of combat sections within the Muslim Brotherhood and the attempt to recruit exiled Bosnians for the cause of the brotherhood was his idea. As a result of various personal conflicts within both organizations he withdrew from the leadership of the Muslim Brotherhood and the Croatian National Resistance in 1964. His withdrawal from Croatian emigrant circles took place at a time when a separate Bosnian Muslim (Bosniak) national consciousness was starting to gain traction.

Death

He is said to have been killed or poisoned in a hotel in London in 1971, supposedly because his killers suspected him of being a Mossad agent.

Works
Books

 Mahmoud K. Muftic: Researches on the Aura Phenomena, Metaphysical Research Group, 1960, second ed. 1970, Hastings, Society of Metaphysicians, 

Articles

Muftic MK (1951). L'isolation de microbes cérolytiques. Experientia (= Cellular and Molecular Life Sciences), 7(6):219–220.
Muftic MK (1951). [Radical tonsillectomy with diathermocoagulation of the tonsillar arteries]. Les Annales D'oto-laryngologie, 68(8–9):716–721.
Muftic MK (1955). Demonstration of fat peroxides in Mycobacteria tuberculosis treated by cerase. Enzymologia. 15;17(4):222-4.
Muftic MK, and Loutfi SD (1955). A Case of Large Diverticulum of the Eustachian Tube. Br Med J. Apr 23, 1955; 1(4920): 1010.
Muftic MK (1956). Cerase : A wax-decomposing enzyme in experimental tuberculosis. British Journal of Tuberculosis and Diseases of the Chest, Volume 50, Issue 4, pp. 356–358.
Muftic MK (1957). Acetazolamide in Ménière's Disease. JAMA Otolaryng. Head Neck Surg. 1957;65(6):575–579. 
Atia, IM and Muftic, MK (1957). Hypnosis in the psychosomatic investigation of female homosexuality. Br. J. Med. Hypn. pp. 41–46.
Muftic MK (1957). Mutation of mycobacteria to proactinomyces by radioactive cobalt. Mycopathologia et mycologia applicata, Volume 8, Issue 2, pp. 121–126.
Muftic MK (1957). Isolation properties of the cerase. Enzymologia. 1957 Jan 30;18(1):9–13
Muftic MK (1957). Relation between iron content and peroxidase activity of cerase. Enzymologia 18(1):18-21
Muftic MK (1957). Mechanism of cerase action. Enzymologia. 30;18(1):14–7
Muftic MK (1958). A psychokinetic theory of hypnotism. Br. J. Med. Hypn. 10: 11–23.
Muftic MK (1958). Mycostatin in Treatment of Otomycoses. Mycoses Volume 1, Issue 5, pp. 156–161.
Muftic MK (1958). Prevention of Hemorrhages in E. N. T. Surgery by Interstitial Application of Thromboplastin. AMA Arch Otolaryngol. 67(5):542–545. doi:10.1001/archotol.1958.00730010556007.
Muftic MK (1958). Eustachian tube biopsy cannula. The Laryngoscope Volume 68, Issue 2, pp. 131–132.
Muftic MK (1958). Advances in the pharmacological study of cerase—A new anti-tuberculous agent. British Journal of Tuberculosis and Diseases of the Chest, Volume 52, Issue 4, pp. 308–312. DOI: 10.1016/S0366-0869(58)80007-6.
Muftic MK (1959). Investigation of resistance of mycobacteria to decolorization. Tubercle Volume 40, Issue 1, pp. 50–53
Muftic MK (1959). Advances in Pathogenesis and Treatment of Otosclerosis. Acta Otolaryngol. 50(1):3–12.
Muftic MK (1960). Genus Blastomycoides As A Mykological Entity. Mycoses Volume 3, Issue 1, pp. 16–25
Muftic MK (1960). The genus Blastomycoides as a mycological entity. Mycopathologia et mycologia applicata, Volume 12, Issue 4, pp. 265–277
Muftic MK (1960). Treatment of Chronic Otitis Media By Chloromycetin and Streptomycin. The Journal of Laryngology & Otology, Vol. 74, Issue 02, pp. 100–105
Muftic MK (1961). Studies on cell-wall chemistry of Mycobacteria. Japanese Journal of Tuberculosis 9:11–7.
Muftic MK (1962). Isolation and purification of the penicillinase from mycobacteria. Experientia, Volume 18, Issue 1, pp 17–18
Muftic MK (1962). Middlebrook-Dubos neutral red test in Mycobacterium tuberculosis treated by cerase. Indian Journal of Medical Sciences, 16:230–236.
Muftic MK (1963). Polypeptidyl Tuberculins. Pathologia et Microbiologia 26:494–503. DOI:10.1159/000161403.
Muftic MK (1963). The mechanism of mycobacterial pathogenicity. British Journal of Diseases of the Chest, Volume 57, Issue 1, January 1963, pp. 22–29. DOI: 10.1016/S0007-0971(63)80004-2.
Muftic MK (1963). Die Klassifizierung der verschiedenen Arten der Gattung Candida mit der „Amid-Reihe“ nach Bönicke. Hefepilze als Krankheitserreger bei Mensch und Tier 1963, pp 9–11
Muftic MK (1963). Study of Amide Metabolism in Candida. Pathologia et Microbiologia 1963;26:250–253. DOI:10.1159/000161371
Muftic MK (1964). A New Phenol–Hypochlorite Reaction for Ammonia. Nature 201:622–623
Muftic MK (1964). N-acetyl-naphthylamine esterase activity as a virulence test in Mycobacteria. Zentralbl Bakt Prasitenk Infektionskrankh Hyg: 353–357.
Muftic MK, and Roch-Ramel F (1964). Pharmacological study of a peptide obtained during a tuberculin skin reaction. Arzneimittelforschung. 14:1012–4.
Muftic MK, and Tuncman SZ (1964). Quantitative analysis of neutral red test in mycobacteria. British Journal of Diseases of the Chest, Volume 58, Issue 2, pp. 85–89. DOI: 10.1016/S0007-0971(64)80037-1.
Muftić, M. (1964). Dr Karlo Marchesi: trideset-godišnji jubilej znanstvenog rada. Hrvatska revija, 14, 51–53.
Albertz H, and Muftic M (1968). Automatische Natrium-Fluxometrie. Biophysik 1968;4(3):214–223. 
Muftic MK (1969). Characteristic changes in mycobacterium tuberculosis induced by some tensides (surface-active agents). Tubercle, Volume 50, Issue 3, pp. 305–312. DOI: 10.1016/0041-3879(69)90056-7.
Muftic MK, and Atia IM (1969). A new induction method: electrohypnosis. Journal of the American Society of Psychosomatic Dentistry & Medicine 1969;16(2):40-6.
Muftic MK (1971). Influence of subcutaneous application of trans-3-methyl-2-hexanoic acid on induction of hypnosis. Journal of the American Institute of Hypnosis. 12(3):118–119, 140.
Muftic MK (1971). Are the catecholamines precursors of the catatonine? Journal of the American Institute of Hypnosis, 12(1):29–32.
Muftic MK (1971). Psychological crusades of the modern time. Nigerian Journal of Islam, 1:2 (1971), pp. 23–28.

Patents

Kutzsche A, Muftic MK, Peissker H (1969). 3-methyl-5-isopropylphenyl esters of n-pyrrolidino and n-morpholino carboxylic acids. US Patent US 3457262 A.
Gutsche K, Muftic MK (1972). Pyrimidine derivatives. US Patent US 3632584 A
Albrecht R, Muftic MK, Schröder E (1973). 5-nitro-furfurylidene antimicrobic agents. US Patent US 3716531 A.

References

Bosnia and Herzegovina microbiologists
Academic staff of the University of Lausanne
Schering people
Research Center Borstel people
Botanists with author abbreviations
Yugoslav anti-communists
People of the Cold War
Yugoslav expatriates in West Germany
Yugoslav expatriates in Switzerland
Yugoslav expatriates in Egypt
Yugoslav expatriates in Iraq
Year of birth uncertain
1971 deaths